The Creature Commandos are a fictional DC Comics team of military superhumans originally set in World War II. The original team was introduced in Weird War Tales #93 (November 1980), created by J. M. DeMatteis and Pat Broderick. The team was composed of a human team leader, a werewolf, a vampire, a Frankenstein's monster, and a gorgon.

The modern team first appeared in their own miniseries Creature Commandos #1-8 (May–December 2000); this version was written by Tim Truman and drawn by Scot Eaton.

Marc Singer portrayed team leader General Matthew Shrieve in the third season of the Arrowverse series Arrow. An animated series centered on the team is in development at DC Studios for the streaming service HBO Max, as the first installment of the DC Universe (DCU).

Concept and creation
Asked how the Creature Commandos came about, writer J. M. DeMatteis recalled: 

DeMatteis didn't stay on the feature very long, and his replacement was Robert Kanigher, who wrote the series until Weird War Tales was canceled in 1983.

Fictional team history

Project M
Project M is a secret government organization that began during World War II and specializes in experimental biotechnology and necromancy. Known creations of the Project beside the Creature Commandos include Miss America and the G.I. Robot. The Project's main scientist is Professor Mazursky. He was aided by Robert Crane. As told in Young All-Stars #12, they operated from a secret underground complex on the mythical Ferris Island in New York.

In 1942, Project M created the Creature Commandos. They were: Lt. Matthew Shrieve (a normal human), Warren Griffith (a werewolf), Sgt. Vincent Velcro (a vampire), Pvt. Elliot "Lucky" Taylor (a Frankensteinian monster) and Dr. Myrna Rhodes (a gorgon).

Project M yielded other interesting specimens. Most notably, they were behind the creation of the heroine Miss America. Prof. Mazursky kidnapped her after his original subject perished. At first, his experiments appeared to have left her incapacitated. He later returned her unconscious form to the surface world. After that, she began a career as a masked heroine, but was critically injured while fighting alongside the Freedom Fighters. Project M recovered her and nursed her back to health. While there, Project M was visited by the Young All-Stars, who had discovered that Project M had been infiltrated. A criminal named Deathbolt was there seeking a new physical host for the disembodied brain of the Ultra-Humanite. The Ultra-Humanite took over the body of a dinosaur recovered from Dinosaur Island.

During the same visit, the Young All-Stars witnessed the unfinished body of the machine that would later be known as the G.I. Robot.

World War II
The team's first mission was in France, where they destroyed Nazi-manufactured android duplicates of the Allied leaders. In their next mission to France to free scientist Dr. Renee Frederique, the Commandos ultimately found her in a death camp, and they had no choice but to kill her. Her knowledge of a chemical nerve gas was too risky to be left in Nazi hands. Because of his part in the killing, Taylor attempted suicide. Although the doctors attempted to repair him, he remained mute for the rest of the series. On another morally dubious mission, the team caused the deaths of dozens of super soldier children.

In 1943, the Commandos were deployed to Dinosaur Island in the South Pacific. They were supposed to solve the disappearance of several Allied spotter planes, but discovered a hidden Axis naval base and were able to trick the dinosaurs in turning on the Japanese navy. Shrieve took pictures for his commanders as proof of the island's existence, but Velcro destroyed them; he believed that the war would bring destruction to the dinosaurs.

When they returned to Dinosaur Island, they met J.A.K.E. 1, the G.I. Robot. He met the Commandos when their plane was attacked by a dinosaur and crashed into the beach. Together, the soldiers discovered an underwater civilization, a supposed lost colony of Atlantis situated in the Pacific. The lost colony had created a group of robots to carry on the work of Atlantean conquest, and these androids took control of the G.I. Robot's mind. J.A.K.E. 1 ultimately overrode their commands and sacrificed itself to destroy the colony.

At the end of the war, the Creature Commandos and J.A.K.E. 2 (and its robot dog and robot cat) were forced to man a rocket aimed at Berlin. But the rocket went radically off-course and headed out of the atmosphere into deep space. Much later, they (with J.A.K.E. 2, as of Action Comics #872) appeared as captives in Brainiac's ship.

Modern era

The original team, with J.A.K.E. 2, is freed from the confines of Brainiac's ship, which is now under control by Kandorians. Frankenstein, whose sense of time is not the same as his comrades, convinces his group to trust Superman and they join in with a fight against the threat that freed them, an attack by the villains Reactron and Metallo. The American military conspiracy that has attacked the Kandorians sweep up the Commandos, though they are not quite sure of the value of the group.

Somehow, the original team later returned to Earth and to Project M, where they continued to serve as a special operations force. To keep pace with their aging physiology, Mazursky, the doctor who had originally mutated them, continued to perform a series of body modifications. This process extended their lives, but at the cost of their humanity.

At an unspecified date in the near future, the various original team members adopted code names. Project M continued to grow in size, and the original team came to form the core field team codenamed M-Team Alpha. M-Team Alpha was sporadically infused with new operatives as attrition took its toll. Presumably, Lt. Shrieve died or retired along the way. In his place came Capt. Lucius Hunter, formerly of Hunter's Hellcats. Hunter was said to be 74 years old, and a recipient of extensive body modifications and rejuvenation therapies. Other new members are: Aten, a mummy-like communications specialist; the Bogman, a humanoid amphibian grunt resembling the Gill-man; and recently-revived cyborg Gunner Mackey, who — along with his partner "Sarge" — died during World War II. Both Lucius Hunter and Gunner Mackey were featured characters in Our Fighting Forces.

While deep undercover, Medusa discovered that Earth's dimension was in danger of invasion by a military alliance from the alternate Earth of Terra Arcana. This other-dimensional conglomerate of warlords included Lord Saturna, Hyathis of Alstair (killed by Tazzala), Tazzala of Korrl (the Queen Bee III), Sayvar the reptilian Lord of Llarr, Kraad of Kranaal, Simon Magus of Blackstaff, Xotar the Weapons Master, Kromm of Mosteel (killed by Lord Saturna), and the Troll King (killed by Velcro).

In order to conquer Earth, the one remaining free dimension, Lord Saturna's alliance enlisted the assistance of a powerful consortium on Future Earth. This group from Earth gave weapons and teleportation technology to the alliance in return for alien real estate. Tazzala and Magus soon betrayed Lord Saturna, cutting their own deal with Murray. In M-Team Alpha's raid on Terra Arcana, Velcro and Gunner were captured by Claw the Unconquered. Claw was convinced to ally with them, and his people joined the battle against Lord Saturna. In the end, Tazzala killed Lord Saturna and was herself killed. Terra Arcana's future was then left in the hands of its people.

The modern Creature Commandos later appeared in The OMAC Project #1-6 (June–November 2005).

During the Infinite Crisis: Villains United Special #1, a metahuman prison named "Enclave M" was shown in New Mexico. Its connection to Project M is unclear at this time. In Booster Gold (vol. 2), Maxwell Lord mentions Project M as still active, at least in the times of his cyberization, and claims he was able to use their resources to give himself a new human body, free from the manipulations of Kilg%re.

In the Justice League: Generation Lost storyline, Maxwell Lord took control of the Creature Commandos to attack the old JLI embassy. During the battle, Lord reveals himself while posing as one of the Creature Commandos, in which he captures the Blue Beetle and escapes. Shortly thereafter, the Creature Commandos broke free from Lord's influence, realizing that they do not know why they are so far from their Project M base.

The New 52
In The New 52 reboot of DC's continuity, a new version of the Creature Commandos was introduced and featured in the pages of Frankenstein, Agent of S.H.A.D.E.. This incarnation of the team works as field agents for the secretive organization S.H.A.D.E. and are led by Frankenstein. The rest of the team consists of Khalis (who appears to be an Egyptian mummy), Warren Griffith (a werewolf), and Vincent Velcoro (given vampiric powers through a modified version of the Man-Bat formula). Griffith and Velcoro were both originally humans who volunteered to be mutated by Dr. Nina Mazursky, who later mutated herself into an amphibious creature resembling a hybrid between the Gill-man and a mermaid (but favoring the Gill-man in actual appearance) in order to fight alongside the team. Frankenstein's estranged wife the Bride was also a member of the team until leaving after learning the fate of her son, with Shrieve returning later on to re-team.

Membership

Original team
 Warren Griffith – Warren was a simple, stuttering, timid farm boy who suffered from clinical lycanthropy. Project M gave him the ability to change into a true werewolf, but the metamorphoses were erratic and uncontrollable due to a flaw in the serum that created him.
 J.A.K.E. – The first G.I. Robot. Destroyed itself and a lost Atlantean colony.
 J.A.K.E. 2 – The second G.I. Robot, lost in space with the Creature Commandos.
 Dr. Myrra Rhodes (previously Myrna) –  Also known as Dr. Medusa. After inhaling strange fumes, she grew living snakes for hair and superficially resembles Medusa, one of the Gorgons.
 Lt. Matthew Shrieve – Matthew was their team leader. He was a fully human hard-as-nails soldier.
 Pvt. Elliot "Lucky" Taylor –  Lucky barely survived stepping on a mine. He was stitched back together against his will, so he resembles the Frankenstein Monster and has damaged vocal cords.
 Sgt. Vincent Velcro (or, in the modern series, Velcoro) –  Velcro volunteered for the project in order to commute a 30-year sentence in the brig for crippling an officer. Like a vampire, he can now change into a bat and requires human blood to survive.

Modern team
 Aten – The mummy-like communications specialist.
 The Bogman – A humanoid amphibian grunt resembling the Gill-man.
 Gunner MacKay – A cyborg, who died during World War II.
 Captain Lucius Hunter – The 74-year-old former member of Hunter's Hellcats.
 Dr. Medusa (Dr. Myrra Rhodes) – An individual whose body has mutated even further into a Gorgon-like form since her first appearances.
 Patchwork (Elliot "Lucky" Taylor) – An individual who is pretty much the same as before.
 Vincent Velcoro – Like Myrra, he has mutated even further due to his treatments and now has red skin and a white ponytail.
 Wolfpack (Warren Griffith) – He is even more savage and out-of-control in this incarnation.

The Agents of S.H.A.D.E.
 Father Time – Leader of S.H.A.D.E.
 Dr. Ray Palmer – U.N. Scientist Liaison, formerly the Atom, creator of S.H.A.D.E. City and the majority of S.H.A.D.E.'s technology.
 Frankenstein – The Frankenstein Monster. He has taken the name solely for simplicity. Frankenstein acts as the team leader.
 The Bride of Frankenstein – Frankenstein's female creation, was intended to be Frankenstein's mate, but refused. She was the first official S.H.A.D.E. agent, but is currently retired in Frankenstein: Agent of S.H.A.D.E. #8 after it was revealed that Father Time reanimated and imprisoned her and Frankenstein's son in "the Zoo".
 Dr. Nina Mazursky – A Gill-man/mermaid hybrid (but resembling, and still depicted as, the Gill-man), the team scientist, and the creator of S.H.A.D.E.'s Creature Commandos. The first generation was a failure and imprisoned in "the Zoo". The second generation is listed as follows.
 Vincent Velcoro – A vampire who serves as the team pilot.
 Warren Griffith – A werewolf who serves as the soldier.
 Khalis – A mummy who serves as the team medic. His origin and abilities are classified/unknown.
 Matthew Shrieve – A former P.O.W. with ties to the Commandos and Robotman during World War II.

Continuity
 The Creature Commandos miniseries is not billed as an Elseworlds tale, but the author Tim Truman describes it as taking place "a second in the future". Various modifications were made to the team members' names and appearances. Truman renamed original team members Velcro and Myrna as "Velcoro" and "Myrra".
 Truman said that he based Patchwork's character on the DC Universe character the Patchwork Man from Swamp Thing #3.
 The villains in this series are old Justice League of America villains dating back from 1960 to 1963. Xotar's first appearance was Brave and the Bold #29. Simon Magus, Saturna, and the Troll King are from JLA #2. Hyathis, Kromm and Sayvar are from Justice League of America #3. Tazzala has presumably some relation to Zazzala, who appeared in Justice League of America #23. Kraad is from Justice League of America #25.
 The usage of Claw the Unconquered in this series is rendered true to his Pre-Crisis origins.
 Project M is shown as still active in current continuity, at least once connected with Checkmate, and responsible for reversing the cyborg transformation of Maxwell Lord. With Orr as his chief and prominent member, Project M is directly responsible for creating Equus, enhancing the Wildebeest and exploiting Cyborg's technology for military uses.
 The original Creature Commados appeared in Weird War Tales #93, 97, 100, 102, 105, 108-112, 114-119, 121 and 124.

Other versions

Flashpoint
In the alternate timeline of the Flashpoint event, Lt. Matthew Shrieve was ambushed by Nazi soldiers, and then saved by Frankenstein. Later, Shrieve and Frankenstein were invited by Project M to join the Creature Commandos. After the end of World War II, however, Project M was deemed obsolete by Robert Crane's government services. Over 65 years later, Frankenstein and the Creature Commandos revive and escape from the lab facility where they were imprisoned. General Nathaniel Adam then contacted Shrieve's granddaughter, Miranda to hunt down the Creature Commandos. The Creature Commandos then travel to Gotham City, where Dr. Mazursky last lived and find his cabin, only to learn he has moved to Romania. The group is then ambushed by Miranda, along with the G.I. Robot and a platoon of soldiers. Miranda's tells them that her grandfather attempted to assemble a second incarnation of the Creatures Commandos, consisting of Solomon Grundy, Man-Bat and Doctor Phosphorus, who turned on him and killed him. Miranda blames monsters for ruining her life. Velcoro saved Frankenstein from the G.I. Robot and Miranda shot Griffith with silver. The team is then saved by Bride, Frankenstein's wife, who is still alive. After Miranda was taken captive, Bride explains to the Creatures Commandos that she is working as an agent of S.H.A.D.E. She then reveals to Miranda that the second Creature Commandos had been working for General Sam Lane, who is truly the one really responsible for the deaths of Miranda's family. Later, the Creature Commandos travel to Romania, where they found a small village populated by monsters. The village is then attacked by a giant G.I. Robot. Frankenstein and Bride combat the G.I. Robot, while Miranda helped Nina care for Griffith's wounds, and suggest going to the nearby castle where Dr. Mazursky is alive, who is then reunited with his daughter. Mazursky explains that the village's inhabitants were peaceful, and that they were the basis for creating the Creature Commandos. When Project M was deemed obsolete, Dr. Mazursky escaped and returned to the village for eternal life. After Frankenstein and Bride destroyed the G.I. Robot, Velcoro died from the sunrise, Griffith is recovering to being human again and developing a relationship with Nina. Frankenstein, the Bride, and Miranda depart from the Creature Commandos and participate in the Atlantean/Amazon war.

Collected editions

The original team's adventures have been collected in the following trade paperback:

In other media

Television
 The Creature Commandos appear in the Batman: The Brave and the Bold short "The Creature Commandos in The War That Time Forgot!", with Lt. Matthew Shrieve voiced by Marc Worden, Warren Griffith, Sgt. Vincent Velcro, and Pvt. Elliot "Lucky" Taylor all voiced by Dee Bradley Baker, and Dr. Myrra Rhodes by Cathy Cavadini.
 The Creature Commandos appear in a self-titled segment of DC Nation Shorts, with Lt. Matthew Shrieve voiced by Chris Cox, Pvt. Warren Griffith by Dana Snyder, Sgt. Vincent Velcoro and Pvt. Elliot "Lucky" Taylor by Kevin Shinick, and Dr. Myrra Rhodes by Rachel Ramras.
 Matthew Shrieve appears in flashbacks depicted in the third season of Arrow, portrayed by Marc Singer. This version is a U.S. Army general and member of A.R.G.U.S. While overseeing Oliver Queen and Tatsu and Maseo Yamashiro's work in Hong Kong, he betrayed A.R.G.U.S. to steal the "Alpha-Omega" virus and cripple China, during which he infected and killed the Yamashiros' son Akio with it. Shrieve is ultimately foiled by Queen and the Yamashiros before Queen brutally tortures him and Maseo executes him.
 The Creature Commandos will appear in a self-titled HBO Max / DC Universe animated miniseries that is being developed by Warner Bros. Animation, DC Studios and James Gunn. The titular team will consist of Rick Flag Sr., Eric Frankenstein, Bride of Frankenstein, Dr. Nina Mazursky, G.I. Robot, Doctor Phosphorus, and Weasel.

Film
The Creature Commandos appear in DC Showcase: Sgt. Rock, with Lt. Matthew Shrieve voiced by Keith Ferguson while the rest of the unit have no dialogue.

See also
 Nick Fury's Howling Commandos, a similar team from Marvel Comics
 The Bureau of Paranormal Research and Defense, a team of fantastic creatures featured in magazines published by Dark Horse Comics
 The Perhapanauts, a team of monster hunters that includes Bigfoot and the Chupacabra that appears in Image Comics
 Proof, a government-run team of monster hunters, including Proof the Sasquatch

References

External links
 
 Creature Commandos at Comic Vine
 
 Creature Commandos (series) at the Big Comic Book DataBase
 Creature Commandos at the DCU Guide
 Dinosaur Island at Don Markstein's Toonopedia
 Supermanartists.org DC History 7
 Dave's Long Box review of Weird War Tales #119

Interviews
 Fanzing Interview with Tim Truman

2000 comics debuts
DC Comics military personnel
DC Comics superhero teams
DC Comics fantasy characters
DC Comics titles
Fictional soldiers
DC Comics set during World War II